Pseudocolaspis setulosa is a species of leaf beetle of the Democratic Republic of the Congo, described by Édouard Lefèvre in 1886.

References

Eumolpinae
Beetles of the Democratic Republic of the Congo
Beetles described in 1886
Taxa named by Édouard Lefèvre
Endemic fauna of the Democratic Republic of the Congo